This is a list of notable faculty and alumni of the Indian Institute of Technology Bombay.

Academics

Arts

Business

Humanities and Social Sciences

Politics, Law, and Civil Services

Science and technology

Others 

Achyut Godbole, businessman and writer
Ajit Ranade, economist and vice chancellor of Gokhale Institute Of Politics & Economics, Pune
Anil Kamath, Indian-American computer scientist
Anil Kumar, Indian-American businessman
Arun Netravali, Indian-American computer engineer and former president of Bell Laboratories
Atul Tandon, management academic and former director of Mudra Institute of Communications, Ahmedabad
Avinash Deshpande, astrophysicist and professor of physics at Raman Research Institute
Beheruz Sethna, Indian-American business academic
Dharmendra Modha, Indian-American computer scientist
Dinesh Mohan, honorary professor at the Indian Institute of Technology, Delhi
Dulal Panda, cell biologist and chair professor at the Indian Institute of Technology, Bombay
George Varghese, Indian-American computer scientist
Lalit Surajmal Kanodia, entrepreneur and chairman of Datamatics
Madan Rao, condensed matter and biophysicist at the National Centre for Biological Sciences, Bangalore
Madhavan Mukund, director and professor at the Chennai Mathematical Institute
Manas Kumar Santra, cell biologist and biochemist at the National Centre for Cell Science, Pune
Narendra Kumar, theoretical physicist
Nitin Nohria, Indian-American academic and former dean of Harvard Business School
N. K. Naik, aerospace engineer and professor emeritus at the Indian Institute of Technology, Bombay
Parag Agrawal, Indian-American software engineer and CEO of Twitter
Prashant Ranade, Indian-American business executive and former co-chair of Syntel
Pravin Krishna, Indian-American economist
Rajive Bagrodia, Indian-American computer scientist and entrepreneur
Ranjan Raj, actor
Sadanand Joshi, Indian-American petroleum engineer and president of Joshi Technologies International, Inc
S. Shankar Sastry, Indian-American electrical engineer and professor at University of California, Berkeley
Sudheendra Kulkarni, politician and columnist
Sudhir Ahuja, Indian-American business executive and academic
Suresh P. Sethi, Indian-American engineer and academic
Umesh Waghmare, theoretical physicist and professor at Jawaharlal Nehru Centre for Advanced Scientific Research, Bangalore
Vikas Joshi, founder of Harbinger group
Vinay K. Nandicoor, immunologist and the director of Centre for Cellular and Molecular Biology, Hyderabad
Viral Acharya, economist and former deputy governor of Reserve Bank of India
Virendra Gupta, founder at VerSe Innovation
V. V. Chari, Indian-American economist and professor at University of Minnesota

References

Indian Institutes of Technology people
Indian Institute of Technology Bombay people
IIT Bombay
IIT Bombay alumni